Shenurovo is a rural locality (a village) in Kubenskoye Rural Settlement, Kharovsky District, Vologda Oblast, Russia. The population was 16 as of 2002.

Geography 
Shenurovo is located 28 km northwest of Kharovsk (the district's administrative centre) by road. Nizhne-Kubensky is the nearest rural locality.

References 

Rural localities in Kharovsky District